Ihor Dmytrovych Poklad (born December 10, 1941 in Frunze, Kirghiz SSR) is a Ukrainian composer, People's Artist of Ukraine (1997), Merited Worker of Arts (1989).

Born in Bishkek, after the World War II, Poklad with his family moved to Ternopil (Tarnopol) where he finished high school and music school in 1957. Later continued his music studies in Kiev in the Glier Institute and the Kiev Conservatory. Poklad started off his career in the Academical Ensemble of the Internal Troops of Ukraine of Songs and Dances. He later graduated from the Kiev Conservatory in 1967. He is also a recipient of the National Artist of Ukraine Award, and a laureate of the Shevchenko National Prize (1986).

References

External links
 Biography at pisni.org.ua

1941 births
Living people
People from Bishkek
Ukrainian composers
Recipients of the Shevchenko National Prize
Recipients of the title of People's Artists of Ukraine
R. Glier Kyiv Institute of Music alumni
Kyiv Conservatory alumni
Kyrgyzstani people of Ukrainian descent